Stóra-Björnsfell is an elongated medium-sized tuya located in Iceland. It contains pillow lava, hyaloclastite and sheet lava. The volcano formed when a subglacial eruption occurred beneath an ice sheet during the last ice age. Stóra-Björnsfell's pillow lava appears originally to have erupted from a fissure.

See also
Volcanism of Iceland

Tuyas of Iceland
Pleistocene volcanoes
West Volcanic Zone of Iceland